Buchema hadromeres is a species of sea snail, a marine gastropod mollusk in the family Horaiclavidae.

It was formerly included within the family Turridae.

Description
The length of the shell attains 14 mm.

Distribution
This species occurs in the Caribbean Sea off Jamaica, Colombia and Suriname.

References

External links
  Tucker, J.K. 2004 Catalog of recent and fossil turrids (Mollusca: Gastropoda). Zootaxa 682:1–1295.
 

hadromeres
Gastropods described in 1927